Lucky Jim is an album by the American rock band the Gun Club, released in 1993. It was the band's final studio album. The album was "dedicated to the cities of Saigon and London, Fall and Winter 1991".

Production
The album was recorded in the Netherlands, with the band made up of Jeffrey Lee Pierce, Romi Mori and Nick Sanderson. Bart Van Poppel played organ during the recording sessions. The producer, Peer Rave, was from Eindhoven, Netherlands and he had worked at studios there and in Haarlem. In 1994 he moved to Santa Barbara, California where he worked as an engineer and joined the Rollins Band on tour to make live recordings. He returned to Europe after a year.

Critical reception

Trouser Press called the album "an eerily austere record that displays the more spectral side of Pierce’s voice, particularly on the dejected title track and 'Cry to Me' ... the manner in which he replaces post-adolescent rage with full-blown adult emptiness is mighty impressive." Billboard deemed it "a haunting record that reflected Pierce's experiences in Japan and Vietnam, countries to which he traveled several times in the early '90s."

AllMusic wrote" "Lucky Jim, it turns out, didn't just signify the passage of a man, but the disappearance of the only real American rock band left in the world." The Spin Alternative Record Guide concluded that "if the Gun Club's execution on the elegiac Lucky Jim directly recalls the Delta only once ('Anger Blues'), the album is permeated with a sadness and displacement fundamental to the deep blues." Record Collector deemed the songs "gutbucket
blues and melancholy acoustic outings," writing that "Pierce found a new kind of intimate personal blues towards the end."

Track listing

Personnel
Gun Club
Jeffrey Lee Pierce - vocals, lead guitar, arrangements
Romi Mori - bass
Nick Sanderson - drums
with:
Bart Van Poppel - organ on "Cry to Me" and "Anger Blues"
Simon Fish - drums on "Blue Monsoons"

References

The Gun Club albums
1993 albums
Triple X Records albums